The Bandung Institute of Technology (abbreviated as ITB) is a national research university located in Bandung, Indonesia. Since its establishment in 1920, ITB has been consistently recognized as Indonesia's premier STEM-based academic institution and reserves its place among the country's top elite universities. It has produced many notable leaders in science, engineering, politics, business, academia, and culture.

ITB is ranked 235th internationally according to QS World University Rankings, and ranked 67th in QS Asian University Rankings. Domestically, the university is ranked 2nd by QS World University Rankings and ranked 3rd by Times Higher Education. ITB has the highest score threshold in Indonesia's national state university entrance test in science and technology. To this day, its engineering and science faculties are known to be the toughest to be admitted into.

History

Bandung Institute of Technology traces its origin to the Technische Hoogeschool te Bandoeng (THB) which was founded during the centuries-old Dutch colonialism of Indonesia. The project was initially proposed by Karel Albert Rudolf Bosscha, a Dutch entrepreneur and philanthropist. His proposal was later approved by the colonial government to meet increasing demand of technical know-how in the colony.

The school building was designed in 1918 by a Dutch architect named Henri Maclaine Pont by blending Indonesian vernacular architecture with modern elements. The school first opened its doors on 3 July 1920. By then, it only had one active department, the Faculty of Technical Science and one academic major, The Department of Road and Water Resources Engineering.

During the 1940s, the university rapidly changed hands and experience various renaming.

During the Japanese occupation in the Second World War and ensuing years, the school was renamed as the Industrial University by the Japanese administration. This name was short-lived as a few years later, the Japanese surrender paved the way for Indonesia's declaration of independence and the campus was renamed as Technical High School by the newly-declared republic. 

A year later, the Dutch colonial government would return to re-occupy Indonesia and took re-directorship of the campus. It was renamed again as Emergency University of Dutch East Indies as the Indonesian National Revolution raged across the colony. It was during this time that the campus would begin operating the Faculty of Engineering and Faculty of Science under the University of Indonesia.

On 2 March 1959, the two faculties of University of Indonesia in Bandung was declared a separate academic entity.  Bandung Institute of Technology was founded for higher learning in natural sciences, technologies, and fine arts.

Campuses

The ITB main campus along with its other campuses, cover a total area of about 770,000 square metres.

Ganesha Campus 
The original and main campus in Ganesha has a wide range of facilities. Apart from lecture classes and laboratories, the campus boasts an art gallery, a dedicated sports centre, central library, medical clinic and extracurricular areas.

Jatinangor Campus 
Due to the increasing number of students, the decision was made to develop another campus elsewhere. The second campus in Jatinangor served as an integral part of the university and is on the same standing as the Ganesha campus.

Cirebon Campus 
ITB plans to build a brand-new campus in Cirebon so as to anticipate future research and educational endeavors. This will be the university's commitment in further developing human resources of Indonesia.

Academics

Quality and reputation

ITB is ranked 235th at 2023 QS World University Rankings, and ranked 63rd in QS Asian University Rankings. ITB is universally and consistently placed among the top three elite universities in the country, having the highest score threshold in Indonesia's national state university entrance test in 2009. Out of the 422,159 candidates who applied, only 2,000 are successfully admitted. To this day, engineering faculties in ITB is nationally accepted as the finest in the country and as such, they are among the toughest to be admitted into. 

Apart from STEM-based faculties, the campus also opened a business school called the School of Business and Management (SBM). SBM is considered as the most prestigious and elite business school in Indonesia and regarded as the best business school in Indonesia by eduniversal ranking, global brand magazine and SWA Magazine, the most popular business magazine in Indonesia.

Research
According to the rector of ITB, ITB had built an eight-storey mining research centre for both national and international research such as research on oil reservoirs, production optimisation, geological exploitation and coal exploitation development worth Rp110 billion ($12.1 million).

Faculties and programs
Consisting of 12 faculties and schools, ITB is not only focused on the fields of STEM but also arts and business management which have been recognized at national and international levels.

Natural Sciences Cluster

Pharmacy Cluster

Engineering Cluster

Social Sciences, Arts, and Humanities Cluster

Faculty of Art and Design (FAD) 
FSRD ITB is a bright and enthusiastic higher education institution at the forefront of Indonesian undergraduate and graduate visual art and design studies. The academic aim of the FSRD ITB is to deliver higher-quality education, research, and community services in all areas of visual art and design. The rich blend of technical and artistic knowledge, intersecting with the borders and frontiers in the domains of sciences, engineering, and business at ITB, is the trademark of visual art and design education at FSRD. In 2022, Art and Design program in the FSRD ITB was one of the QS World's top 20 Art & Design schools in the Asia region.

Notable people and alumni
ITB has produced more than 120,000 alumni who play a significant role in nation-building, among others are:
 Aburizal Bakrie, an Indonesian entrepreneur and politician, former chairman of Bakrie Group, former Indonesian Coordinating Ministry for Human Development and Cultural Affairs (2005–2009), Chairman of Golkar Party (2009–present), the richest person in Indonesia (Forbes 2007). From 2004 until 2005 Bakrie served as Indonesia's Coordinating Minister for Economy.
 Achmad Zaky, CEO & co-founder of Bukalapak.
 Ahmad Sadali, Abstract Painter and Lecturer the ITB. 
 Albert Yonathan Setyawan, Contemporary ceramic artist based in Japan.
 Arcandra Tahar, Vice Minister and formerly Minister of Energy and Mineral Resources of the Republic of Indonesia on the Working Cabinet.
 Betti Alisjahbana, Indonesian businesswoman, former chief of IBM Indonesia.
 Baharuddin Jusuf Habibie, the Third President of Indonesia (1998–1999).
 Ciputra, Indonesian real estate tycoon, top 15 the richest people in Indonesia 2016.
 Djoko Santoso, Chief of Staff of the Indonesian Army from 2005 to 2007, appointed as the Commander of the Indonesian National Armed Forces served from 2007 to 2010, Former President of Association of Indonesian Geophysicist (1998-2000), Former Rector of ITB (2005-2010), Former Rector of UI (2012-2013), Director General of Higher Education.
 Djuanda Kartawidjaja, Prime Minister of Indonesia (1957–1963).
 Fadel Muhammad, Governor of Gorontalo (2001–2009), Minister for Maritime and Fisheries (2009–2011), Deputy Chairman of Golkar Party.
 Ginandjar Kartasasmita, former Speaker of Indonesian Regional Representative Council (DPD-RI), former Indonesian Coordinating Minister of Economy.
 Harry Roesli, Indonesian artist and musician.
 Hartono Rekso Dharsono, the first Secretary General of ASEAN.
 Hatta Rajasa, Indonesian Coordinating Minister of Economy (2009–2014).
 Herman Johannes, Indonesian National Hero, Member of Indonesia's Presidential Supreme Advisory Council from 1968 to 1978, and the Minister for Public Works and Energy from 1950 to 1951, member of the executive board of UNESCO from 1954 to 1957, professor, scientist, former dean of Gadjah Mada University.
 Hokky Situngkir, Indonesian scientist. 
 Jero Wacik, Indonesian Minister of Culture and Tourism (2004–2011).
 Jesica Fitriana Martasari Alfharisi, Puteri Indonesia Pariwisata 2019 and Miss Supranational 2019 2nd runner-up.
 Joko Anwar, film director.
 Jusman Syafii Djamal, former Indonesian Minister of Transportation, former CEO of Indonesian Aerospace - PT Dirgantara Indonesia (Persero), an Indonesian aircraft manufacturing firm, President Commissioner PT. Garuda Indonesia, the biggest Indonesia stateowned airlines company.
 Karen Agustiawan, former President of Pertamina, the largest Indonesian Oil Company.
 Karlina Leksono Supelli, Indonesian philosopher and astronomer. One of Indonesia's first female astronomers.
 Karno Barkah, Indonesian aviation pioneer, recipient of the French Légion d'honneur, former President Director of the Soekarno-Hatta International Airport. 
 Kusmayanto Kadiman, former Minister of Research and Technology of Indonesia.
 Laksamana Sukardi, former Indonesian minister of State-owned Enterprises Management, Indonesian Politician, banker.
 Mangunwijaya, Indonesian architect, writer, and Catholic religious leader.
 Maria Selena, winner of Puteri Indonesia 2011 and represent Indonesia in Miss Universe 2012.
 Merlyna Lim, Indonesian professor, internationally recognized Science & Technology Studies scholar.
 Nabiel Makarim, Indonesian Minister of the Environment (2001–2004).
 Pantur Silaban, Indonesian physicist in theory of relativity.
 Purnomo Yusgiantoro, Indonesian Minister of Defense (2009–present), Minister of Energy and Mineral Resources (2000–2009), former President and Secretary General of OPEC.
 Rachmat Witoelar, former Indonesian Minister of Environment, Special Envoy on Climate Change, Head of National Council on Climate Change.
 Ridwan Kamil, mayor of Bandung from 2013 to 2018, Governor of West Java (2018–present).
 Rinaldi Firmansyah, Former CEO of Telkom Indonesia, the largest fixed-line and wireless telecommunication operator firm in Indonesia.
 Rizal Ramli, former Indonesian Coordinating Minister of Economy, founder and chairman of ECONIT Advisory Group, an independent economic think-tank.
 Roby Muhamad, Indonesian scientist famous for his work in social networking and small-world networks.
 Samaun Samadikun, Indonesian scientist dedicated to the development of electronics.
 Soekarno, The First President of Indonesia (1945-1967).
 Taufik Akbar, Indonesian astronaut.
 Tjokorda Raka Sukawati, inventor of Sosrobahu construction technique.

References

External links

Official website - English section
Alumni association
Bosscha Observatory

 
Universities in West Java
Schools in Bandung
Engineering universities and colleges in Indonesia
ASEAN University Network
Cultural Properties of Indonesia in West Java
Educational institutions established in 1920
1920 establishments in the Dutch East Indies
Universities in Indonesia
Dutch colonial architecture in Indonesia
Indonesian state universities